Lawrence Albro Mason (March 19, 1892 – January 1, 1972)  was an American football and basketball coach.  He served as the head football coach at Hillsdale College in Hillsdale, Michigan in 1918, compiling a record of 1–5.  Mason was also the head basketball coach at Hillsdale for one season, in 1918–19, tallying a mark of 3–7.

References

1892 births
1972 deaths
Basketball coaches from Michigan
Hillsdale Chargers football coaches
Hillsdale Chargers men's basketball coaches
People from Croswell, Michigan